Everett High School is a public high school in Everett, Massachusetts, United States operated by Everett Public Schools. The school's previous building was located on Broadway in Everett for almost a century. A new high school was built on Elm Street, which opened in September 2007.

Athletics

Honors

 27x Greater Boston League Titles - 1955, 1961–65, 1972, 1975, 1995-2013.
 12x Division 1 "Super Bowl" Championships - 1997, 1999, 2001-2003, 2006-2007, 2010-2012, 2016-2017
 2x National Championships - 1914 & 1915 (Co-Champs with Central of Detroit)

Other sports
Baseball 
Basketball
Boys' soccer
Boys’ hockey
Crew/Rowing
Cross country
Field hockey
American football
Girls’ basketball
Girls’ hockey
Girls’ soccer
Girls’ softball
Lacrosse
Golf
Soccer
Tennis
Track
Volleyball
Marching band
Boys Wrestling

Notable alumni

Baseball
Patricia Courtney
Maddy English
Barney Olsen
Basketball
Pat Bradley
Nerlens Noel
Entertainment
Charles Bickford, actor
Ellen Pompeo, actor, producer and director.
Judges
A. David Mazzone
Military
Andrew P. Iosue
Politicians
Edward G. Connolly
George Keverian
Stephen Stat Smith
Sal DiDomenico
American football
Charles Brickley
George Brickley
Matthew W. Bullock
Jackson Cannell
Frank Champi
Johnny Dell Isola
Omar Easy
Diamond Ferri
Mario Giannelli
Hub Hart
Pat Hughes
Pike Johnson
Bobby Leo
Isaiah Likely
Andy Oberlander
Ralph Pasquariello
Al Pierotti
Art Raimo
Dan Ross
Rick Sapienza
Fred Sweetland
Ray Trowbridge

Notable faculty
George Brickley (athletic director and football coach; 1922–1925)
Harry A. Dame (mathematics teacher and football and baseball coach; 1905–1909)
Omar Easy (vice principal; 2012–2019)
Ginger Fraser (science teacher and football and baseball coach; 1916–1917)
Dennis Gildea (English teacher, athletic director, and football, baseball, and track and field coach; 1926–1963)
Frank Keaney (football coach; 1917–1919)
Cleo A. O'Donnell (football coach; 1909–1916)
Moody Sarno (English teacher and football coach; 1938–1941, 1955–1982)

References

External links

Profile at City Data

Public high schools in Massachusetts
Schools in Middlesex County, Massachusetts